Monsters from Mars is an underground rock band from California, formed in 2001.  Originally an instrumental surf rock trio, the band has since grown in size and influences.  Stylistically, the band's current sound incorporates elements of surf rock, garage rock, horror, progressive rock, new wave, experimental electronic music, punk rock, and new trends in underground music.  Sonically, the band's sound comes from its heavy use of spring reverb, tremolo-picked guitar leads, tube equipment, Farfisa organ, synthesizers, baritone guitar, theremin, tape delay effects, and occasional saxophone and prog rock drum solo.   The band's live show is distinguished by its high energy performances, use of theatrics, fog and colored light ambiance, and proclivity for inducing dancing among audience members.

Monsters from Mars is perhaps best known for its instrumental rendition of the Britney Spears hit, Toxic.  Also notable are its connections to the character, Bob Stencil.

Discography

Full-Lengths 
 Play Some Originals and Some Surf Guitar Classics and Obscurities (Tired Machine, 2002)
 2004: A Space Odyssey (Tired Machine, 2004)

Singles 
 Surfing Through A Creepy Castle 7" (Tic Tac Totally, 2006)

External links
 Official Website
 Monsters from Mars on MySpace
 Tic Tac Totally record label

Surf music groups
Musical groups from San Diego